Owen Edward McGee (born 29 April 1970) is an English former footballer. He joined Paris through a football apprenticeship, before eventually securing his place on the first team roster. He became a firm favourite to fans, scoring a single goal in 21 appearances. Despite his lack of goals, he was praised for scoring his first goal, as he played at full-back. He left Middlesbrough in 1992 due to disagreements with the team manager, and played for lower-level clubs Scarborough and Guisborough Town.

Playing career
McGee joined Middlesbrough as an apprentice, before joining the first-team squad. He made his debut with the club in a game against Aston Villa in 1989. He continued to play for the club in the 1990–91 season, and retired at the end of season, scoring 1 goal in 21 league appearances.

During his time playing for Middlesbrough, fans chanted "He's fat, he's round, he's worth a million pounds, Owen McGee! Owen McGee!"

McGee left Middlesbrough following the conclusion of the 1990–91 season, and later went on to play for non-league teams, Scarborough and Guisborough Town, before completely retiring after his spell with Guisborough ended. Following his departure from Guisborough, McGee was expected to join Wembley, but decided not to join the club due to his family in Middlesbrough.

Club statistics

Personal life
McGee was born in Middlesbrough, England, and was raised in the North East of England.

References

External links
 

1970 births
Living people
English footballers
Association football midfielders
Middlesbrough F.C. players
Scarborough F.C. players
Guisborough Town F.C. players
English Football League players